The Wairarapa Fault is an active seismic fault in the southern part of the North Island of New Zealand. It is a dextral (right lateral) strike-slip fault with a component of uplift to the northwest as expressed by the Rimutaka Range. It forms part of the North Island Fault System, which accommodates the transfer of displacement along the oblique convergent boundary between the Indo-Australian Plate and Pacific Plate.

Geometry
The Wairarapa Fault continues south of Lake Wairarapa as the Wharekauhau thrust, which can be traced on the seabed in the Cook Strait for about 30 km with a possible further continuation on a fault strand lying to the northwest. These faults segments are considered likely to be the active traces of the southern Wairarapa Fault. At its northeastern end the fault terminates near Mauriceville, with the displacement apparently continued on the Pa Valley and Alfredton Faults.

Seismicity
Rupture along the Wairarapa Fault and Wharekauhau thrust was responsible for the 1855 Wairarapa earthquake, there is also evidence from trenching that the rupture continued onto the Alfredton Fault. The uplifted beach ridges of Turakirae Head provide a proxy record of prehistoric earthquakes. This record has been checked by trenching across parts of the Wairarapa Fault. The trenching recorded five surface rupturing events since about 5,500 years BP, the last of which is the 1855 earthquake and two of which are not recorded by beach ridges. Together the observations give a mean recurrence interval of about 1,200 years.

See also
Geology of New Zealand
Geology of the Wellington Region
North Island Fault System
Wellington Fault

References

External links
Proceedings of the 1855 Wairarapa Earthquake Symposium, 2005

Seismic faults of New Zealand
Strike-slip faults